Evan Foulkes (c. 1751 – 8 November 1825) was a politician in the United Kingdom.  He was a Member of Parliament (MP)  from 1807 to 1818.

References

External links 
 

1751 births
1825 deaths
Members of the Parliament of the United Kingdom for County Kerry constituencies (1801–1922)
Members of the Parliament of the United Kingdom for English constituencies
UK MPs 1806–1807
UK MPs 1807–1812
UK MPs 1812–1818